Craig Obey is an Australian music producer who released one studio album in 2006. As a DJ, Obey has produced a number of mix compilations including A Night in the Life with Funk Corporation.

In 2000, Obey built the Grooveyard recording studio in Sydney and set up A Higher Sound Recordings, a label set up with Andrew Penhallow and film & media company, The Swish Group. The label signed Disco Montego and  Waldo G.

Discography

Albums

Charting singles

References

Living people
Year of birth missing (living people)
Australian DJs